God with Us is the first Christmas album from Laura Story. Fair Trade Services released the album on October 9, 2015. She worked with Brown Bannister, Cliff Duren, Jeff Pardo, and Ben Shive, in the production of this album.

Critical reception

Andy Argyrakis, indicating in a four star review at CCM Magazine, says, "Naturally, the project is also packed with its fair share of thought-provoking originals (most notably “Love Is Here”), alongside guest artists Steven Curtis Chapman and Brandon Heath, both of whom further enhance this beautiful, sometimes grand batch of timeless pop swaddled in a charming seasonal." Awarding the album three and a half stars for New Release Today, Sarah Fine describes, "Her heartfelt, worshipful vocals are felt throughout each song with authenticity, while still paying tribute to the childlike innocence of the season." Joshua Andre, rating the album four stars at 365 Days of Inspiring Media, writes, "Well done Laura for 10 songs that have touched my soul and changed me for the better". Giving the album four stars from The Christian Beat, Madeleine Dittmer states, "This collection of songs is the perfect mix to start getting you into the Christmas spirit." Michael Dalton, rating the album a three and a half out of five, writes, "For those who favor spiritual substance, there is plenty here."

Track listing

Chart performance

References

Laura Story albums
2015 Christmas albums
Christmas albums by American artists